Wang Ruilin (January 1930 – 8 December 2018) was a general of the Chinese People's Liberation Army (PLA). He was a long-term secretary of Deng Xiaoping and served as a member of the Central Military Commission.

Career
Born in Zhaoyuan, Shandong, Wang joined PLA in 1946, and joined CPC in February 1947. He had served as secretary of Deng Xiaoping since 1952, when Deng was the vice premier of the State Council. When Deng re-emerged in the 1970s, Wang became his secretary again and held this post till Deng's retirement in 1990.

From 1990 to 1995, he was the vice director of general office of CPC Central Committee, secretary of discipline commission of CMC and the vice director of PLA General Political Department, Deputy secretary of the party committee. In 1995, he became a member of the CMC. He attained the rank of lieutenant general in September 1988 and full general in June 1994.

Wang was a member of 13th, 14th and 15th Central Committees of Communist Party of China.

Wang died on 8 December 2018 in Beijing, at the age of 88.

References

1930 births
2018 deaths
People's Liberation Army generals from Shandong
Politicians from Yantai
People's Republic of China politicians from Shandong
Chinese Communist Party politicians from Shandong
Members of the 13th Central Committee of the Chinese Communist Party
Members of the 14th Central Committee of the Chinese Communist Party
Members of the 15th Central Committee of the Chinese Communist Party